Aguinaldo is a thirteenth salary paid to workers in Latin American countries during the Christmas season.

Aguinaldo may also refer to:

 Aguinaldo (name), a surname and given name
 Aguinaldo (music), a folk genre of Christmas music found in Latin America
 Aguinaldo, Ifugao, a municipality in the Philippines
 General Emilio Aguinaldo, Cavite, a municipality in the Philippines
 Aguinaldo Highway, a primary and secondary highway in Cavite, Philippines